Šmihel is a dispersed settlement in the Municipality of Nova Gorica in western Slovenia. It is located in the lower Vipava Valley.

Name
The name of the settlement was changed from Sveti Mihael (literally, 'Archangel Michael') to Šmihel in 1955. The name was changed on the basis of the 1948 Law on Names of Settlements and Designations of Squares, Streets, and Buildings as part of efforts by Slovenia's postwar communist government to remove religious elements from toponyms.

Church
The small church, from which the settlement gets its name, is dedicated to Saint Michael and the belongs to the Parish of Šempas.

References

External links
Šmihel on Geopedia

Populated places in the City Municipality of Nova Gorica